Silvano Fontolan (born 24 February 1955 in Garbagnate Milanese) is an Italian former professional footballer who played as a defender. He made 277 appearances in Serie A.

Honours
Verona
 Serie A champion: 1984–85

References

1955 births
Living people
Sportspeople from the Metropolitan City of Milan
Italian footballers
Association football defenders
Serie A players
Serie B players
Como 1907 players
Inter Milan players
Hellas Verona F.C. players
Ascoli Calcio 1898 F.C. players
Italian football managers
Footballers from Lombardy